This is a list of supermarket chains in Portugal.
Aldi - 73 stores 
Amanhecer - ~330 stores
Apolonia Supermercados - 3 stores
Auchan - 100 stores
Continente - 700 stores
Coviran - 188 stores
E.Leclerc - 88 stores
El Corte Inglés - 2 Stores
Froiz
The Good Food Company (selling Tesco)
Intermarché - 200 Stores
Lidl - 255 Stores
Mercadona
Meu Super - >300 stores
Minipreço - 620 Stores
Overseas Supermarkets (Iceland produce)
Pingo Doce - 455 stores
SPAR - 100 stores

References

Portugal
 
Supermarkets